A straight man is a member of a comedy act who plays a stooge, feed, or foil.

Straight man may also refer to:

 A heterosexual man
 Straight Man, a 1997 novel by Richard Russo